Snøkjerringa Hill is a hill  naunorth-northwest of Snøkallen Hill, on the east side of Ahlmann Ridge in Queen Maud Land. It was mapped by Norwegian cartographers from surveys and air photos by the Norwegian-British-Swedish Antarctic Expedition (1949–52) and named Snøkjerringa ("the snow woman").

References

Hills of Queen Maud Land
Princess Martha Coast